This is a list of Television in South Korea related events from 2016.

New Series & Returning Shows

Drama

Animation

Ending

Drama

References

2016 in South Korean television